A protective hairstyle (a term generally used with reference to Afro-textured hair) is a hairstyle that keeps the hair tucked away with minimum manipulation from the weather. Both cold and hot weather can pose as a threat to healthy hair with frigid air, humidity and water damage from rain and snow. Protective styles can help to retain length and growth. They include braids, wigs, locks, and twists.

Afro-textured hair is often prone to breakage or damage from the elements; protective hairstyles aim to guard against this. However protective hairstyles sometimes involve tension at the scalp, like braids with weaves and wigs, and are not the ideal style. They may also prevent hair from growing, which, if prolonged, may lead to traction alopecia. 

Protective styles require styling hair for a few days and using the correct styles and products. Depending on the hairstyle and how well it is taken care of, protective hairstyles can last between two weeks to two months.

In the United States, some jurisdictions have banned discrimination based on hairstyles associated with African Americans, including protective hairstyles. In 2007, a radio host Don Imus caused an outrage when he called the Rutgers University basketball team "nappy-headed". This led to cancellations of his future show. In 2020 Noah Cyrus made a comment about "nappy hair" which led to many controversies. She later on apologized through social media, saying she didn't know the context and history behind the terms she had used. A federal bill called the Crown Act was passed in 2022: the Creating a Respectful and Open World for Natural Hair Act of 2022 was passed with the intention to prohibit race-based discrimination based on hairstyles and hair texture. In present time Black women have created blogs and YouTube channels to embrace their hairstyles in positive ways.

History

Culture 
Protective hairstyles and braids are an important aspect of African culture, dating back thousands of years. With many intricate patterns and styles, these braids are said to resemble strength and creativity in African tribes and communities. Braids were often used to distinguish between tribes as well as indicate wealth, religion, age, marital status and ethnicity. Even today, braids and other styles are a rite of passage in life. They also are a way for women of color to express themselves.

Slavery 
At the wake of slavery, many women and men from Africa were forced to shave their heads, stripping them of not only their hair but also their culture and humanity. With this, many laws were created to prohibit braids and other cultural and protective hairstyles. These laws were not overturned until the Black Power Movement in the 60s and 70s. Even after the laws were overturned, many still faced discrimination due to their hair type and hairstyles. This had stripped many people of the use of their braids as a  form of culture to the use of braids as function; to keep hair manageable. Many styles were simplified and sometimes they were a struggle to maintain, not having proper access to products and tools. This led to many people using substances like kerosine to moisturize their hair. Later cultural movements would brings back this sense of culture in wearing these protective hairstyles. The word nappy has been used to reference the "frizzy texture" of African American hair since the 1880s.

Braids and cornrows were also used to escape slavery. Since slaves were not allowed to learn how to read or write, another methods of communication was necessary. Thus, came the use of cornrows to draw out maps and pass messages to escape slavery. This method was even used within the Underground Railroad. Additionally, rice and seeds would be woven into the braids in order to grow food after they had escaped.

Preparation and Maintenance

Preparation 
Before using protective hairstyles, it is important to cleanse the hair and the scalp thoroughly, as most protective styles are left in for weeks at a time and cleansing rids hair of product, dirt and oil buildup. A sulfate free shampoo is recommended as to not cause damage and it is important to be gentle while shampooing as rough washing can cause friction and lead to breakage. To prevent water damage and restore oils and moisture into the hair after washing, the next necessary step is to use a deep conditioner and sometimes a leave in conditioner. These conditioners can be paired with additional oils to ensure healthy hair and minimize breakage before, during and after using protective hairstyles to manage hair.

Maintenance 
After the hair is installed, there are many ways to maintain the health of the hair and the style. One of these ways are to wrap hair before sleeping in satin or silk as to minimize friction and frizz created from bedding. A lightweight hair gel can also be added while wrapping hair to further reduce the creation of frizz and flyaways. With the scalp being exposed, it is very important to clean it periodically with shampoo diluted with water. After this and throughout wearing the hairstyles, it is necessary to moisturize the scalp after washing and moisturize the hair regularly. This can be done with many types of oils and leave in conditioners.

References

Afro-textured hair
Hairstyles